Michele Di Gregorio (born 27 July 1997) is an Italian professional footballer who plays as a goalkeeper for  club Monza.

Club career

Inter Milan 
Born in Milan, Italy, Di Gregorio was a youth product of Inter Milan.

Loan to Renate 
On 12 July 2017, Di Gregorio and Alessandro Mattioli were signed by Serie C side Renate on a season-long loan deal. On 30 July he made his debut for Renate in the first round of Coppa Italia in a 3–1 home win over Siracusa. On 3 September, Di Gregorio made his Serie C debut for Renate and he kept his first clean sheet in a 3–0 home win over Padova. One week later he kept his second clean sheet in a 1–0 away win over FeralpiSalò. On 16 September, Di Gregorio kept his third clean sheet in a 3–0 away win over Modena. On 17 December, Di Gregorio kept his 10th clean sheet in a 1–0 home win over Pordenone. Di Gregorio ended his season-long loan to Renate with 38 appearances, 14 clean sheets, and 36 goals conceded.

Loan to Novara 
On 4 July 2018, it was announced that Di Gregorio was loaned to a Serie B club Avellino. However, he did not play any matches for the team and returned to Inter Milan. On 24 August 2018 he was loaned to Novara. On 30 September he made his Serie C debut for Novara in a 1–1 home draw against Juventus U23. On 7 October he kept his first clean sheet for Novara in a 3–0 away win over Piacenza. Three week later he kept his second clean sheet in a 2–0 away win over Pistoiese. On 18 November he kept his third clean sheet in a 0–0 away draw against Cuneo. On 12 December he was sent-off with a red card in the 90th minute of a 1–1 away draw against Alessandria. Di Gregorio ended his loan to Novara with 32 appearances, 12 clean sheets and 28 goals conceded.

Loan to Pordenone 
On 10 July 2019, Di Gregorio was loaned to Serie B club Pordenone on a season-long loan deal. On 13 September he made his debut in Serie B for Pordenone and he kept his first clean sheet for the team in a 1–0 home win over Spezia. Three weeks later, on 5 October, he kept his second clean sheet in a 2–0 home win over Empoli and three more weeks later, on 26 October, he kept his third in a 0–0 home draw against Cittadella. Di Gregorio ended his season-long loan to Pordenone with 35 appearances, 41 goals conceded and 11 clean sheets, and he also help the club to reach the play-off semi-finals, however they lose 2–1 on aggregate against Frosinone.

Monza 
On 27 August 2020, Di Gregorio was sent on loan for the 2020–21 season to newly-promoted Serie B club Monza, on a one-year deal with an option to buy. Following 31 appearances with Monza, 29 in the league, he was re-loaned on 29 June 2021, on a one-year deal with option to buy, counter-option for Inter Milan and conditional obligation to buy. Di Gregorio's obligation for purchase clause was triggered on 29 May 2022, after helping Monza top their first-ever Serie A promotion.

Di Gregorio made his Serie A debut on 13 August, in a 2–1 home defeat to Torino in the first matchday. He kept his first Serie A clean sheet on 18 September, after helping Monza win their first game in the top flight against Italian giants Juventus 1–0.

International career 
On 19 February 2014, Di Gregorio made his Italy under-17 debut as a substitute, replacing Emil Audero in the 59th minute of a 6–0 home win over Hungary U17.

Personal life 
Di Gregorio is affectionately nicknamed "", a play on words in reference to television anime Tiger Mask ( in Italian). He and his partner Samantha have a son named Marcello (b. 2020).

Career statistics

Club

Honours 
Inter Milan
 Campionato Nazionale Primavera: 2016–17

References

External links

 Profile at A.C. Monza

1997 births
Living people
Footballers from Milan
Italian footballers
Association football goalkeepers
Inter Milan players
A.C. Renate players
U.S. Avellino 1912 players
Novara F.C. players
Pordenone Calcio players
A.C. Monza players
Serie C players
Serie B players
Serie A players
Italy youth international footballers